Nurabad or Noor Abad may refer to many Iranian settlements:

Bushehr Province
 Nurabad, Bushehr, a village in Dashtestan County, Bushehr Province, Iran

Chaharmahal and Bakhtiari Province
 Nurabad, Chaharmahal and Bakhtiari, a village in Lordegan County
 Nurabad, Shahrekord, a village in Shahrekord County

East Azerbaijan Province
 Nurabad, East Azerbaijan, in Marand County

Fars Province
 Nurabad, Eqlid, a village in Eqlid County
 Nurabad, Fasa, a village in Fasa County
 Nurabad, Kharameh, a village in Kharameh County
 Nurabad, Fars, a city in Mamasani County
 Nurabad, Mohr, a village in Mohr County

Golestan Province
 Nurabad, Golestan, a village in Gonbad-e Qabus County, Golestan Province, Iran

Hamadan Province
 Nurabad-e Simineh, a village in Bahar County, Hamadan Province, Iran
 Nurabad-e Hajjilu, a village in Kabudarahang County, Hamadan Province, Iran

Hormozgan Province
 Nurabad, Bandar Lengeh, a village in Bandar Lengeh County
 Nurabad, Rudan, a village in Rudan County

Ilam Province
 Nurabad, Ilam, a village in Shirvan and Chardaval County

Isfahan Province
 Nurabad, Buin va Miandasht, a village in Buin va Miandasht County
 Nurabad, Semirom, a village in Semirom County
 Nurabad, Padena, a village in Semirom County
 Nurabad Rural District (Isfahan Province), in Mobarakeh County

Kerman Province
 Nurabad, Esmaili, a village in Anbarabad County
 Nurabad, Hoseynabad, a village in Anbarabad County
 Nurabad 1, a village in Kahnuj County
 Nurabad 2, a village in Kahnuj County
 Nurabad, Manujan, a village in Manujan County
 Nurabad, Nurabad, a village in Manujan County
 Nurabad Rural District (Kerman Province), in Manujan County

Kermanshah Province
 Nurabad, Salas-e Babajani, a village in Salas-e Babajani County
 Nurabad, Sonqor, a village in Sonqor County

Khuzestan Province
 Nurabad, Andimeshk, a village in Andimeshk County
 Nurabad, Dezful, a village in Dezful County
 Nurabad, Izeh, a village in Izeh County

Kurdistan Province
 Nurabad, Kurdistan, a village in Saqqez County

Lorestan Province
 Nurabad, Lorestan, city in the province of Lorestan
 Nurabad, Khorramabad, a village in Khorramabad County
 Nurabad, alternate name of Cheshmeh Barad, in the province of Lorestan
 Nurabad-e Cheshmeh Barqi, in the province of Lorestan
 Nurabad-e Nadar, in the province of Lorestan
 Nurabad Rural District (Lorestan Province)

Markazi Province
 Nurabad, Ashtian, a village in Ashtian County
 Nurabad, Khomeyn, a village in Khomeyn County
 Nurabad, Shazand, a village in Shazand County

Qazvin Province
 Nurabad, Qazvin

Qom Province
 Nurabad, Jafarabad, in Qom Province
 Nurabad, Khalajastan, in Qom Province

Razavi Khorasan Province
 Nurabad, Khoshab, a village in Khoshab County
 Nurabad, Mashhad, a village in Mashhad County
 Nurabad, Nishapur, a village in Nishapur County
 Nurabad, Sabzevar, a village in Sabzevar County
 Nurabad, Torqabeh and Shandiz, a village in Torqabeh and Shandiz County
 Nurabad, Zaveh, a village in Zaveh County

Sistan and Baluchestan Province
 Nurabad-e Naluki, a village in Dalgan County
 Nurabad-e Dasht Abkhvan, a village in Khash County
 Nurabad-e Sar Talap, a village in Khash County

Tehran Province
 Nurabad, Tehran, in Malard County

West Azerbaijan Province
 Nurabad, West Azerbaijan, a village in Showt County

Yazd Province
 Nurabad, Mehriz, a village in Mehriz County
 Nurabad, Taft, a village in Taft County

Zanjan Province
 Nurabad, Zanjan, a city in Khodabandeh County

Other uses
 Nurabad Rural District (disambiguation)

See also 

 Nurobod (disambiguation)